Gnaeus Naevius (c. 270 – c. 201 BC) was a Roman epic poet and dramatist of the Old Latin period. He had a notable literary career at Rome until his satiric comments delivered in comedy angered the Metellus family, one of whom was consul. After a sojourn in prison he recanted and was set free by the tribunes (who had the tribunician power, in essence the power of habeas corpus). After a second offense he was exiled to Tunisia, where he wrote his own epitaph and committed suicide. His comedies were in the genre of Palliata Comoedia, an adaptation of Greek New Comedy. A soldier in the Punic Wars, he was highly patriotic, inventing a new genre called Praetextae Fabulae, an extension of tragedy to Roman national figures or incidents, named after the Toga praetexta worn by high officials. Of his writings there survive only fragments of several poems preserved in the citations of late ancient grammarians (Charisius, Aelius Donatus, Sextus Pompeius Festus, Aulus Gellius, Isidorus Hispalensis, Macrobius, Nonius Marcellus, Priscian, Marcus Terentius Varro).

Biography

Much of the information concerning the life of Naevius is coloured by uncertainty. Aulus Gellius describes the epitaph of Naevius as demonstrating "Campanian arrogance," based on which statement it has been suggested that Naevius was a native of Campania. The phrase "Campanian arrogance" seems, however, to have been a proverbial or idiomatic phrase indicating boastfulness.  Further, the fact that there was a plebeian gens Naevia in Rome, makes it quite possible, even likely, that Naevius was a Roman citizen by birth. He served either in the Roman army or among the socii in the First Punic War, and thus must have reached manhood before 241.

His career as a dramatic author began with the exhibition of a drama in or about the year 235, and continued for thirty years. Towards the close he incurred the hostility of some of the nobility, especially, it is said, of the Metelli, by the attacks which he made upon them on the stage, and at their insistence he was imprisoned. After writing two plays during his imprisonment, in which he is said to have apologized for his former rudeness, he was liberated through the interference of the tribunes of the commons; but he had shortly afterwards to retire from Rome (in or about 204) to Utica. It may have been during his exile, when withdrawn from his active career as a dramatist, that he composed or completed his poem on the First Punic War. Probably his latest composition was his own epitaph, written in saturnian verse:

If these lines were dictated by a jealousy of the growing ascendancy of Ennius, the life of Naevius must have been prolonged considerably beyond 204, the year in which Ennius began his career as an author in Rome. Unlike Livius Andronicus, Naevius was a native Italian, not a Greek; he was also an original writer, not a mere adapter or translator. If it is due to Livius that the forms of Latin literature were, from the first, molded on those of Greek literature, it is due to Naevius that much of its spirit and substance was of native growth.

Works
Like Livius, Naevius professed to adapt Greek tragedies and comedies to the Roman stage. Among the titles of his tragedies are Aegisthus, Lycurgus, Andromache or Hector Proficiscens, Equus Troianus, the last named being performed at the opening of Pompey's theatre (55 BC). The national cast of his genius and temper was shown by his deviating from his Greek originals, and producing at least two specimens of the fabula praetexta (national drama), one founded on the childhood of Romulus and Remus (Lupus or Alimonium Romuli et Remi), the other called Clastidium, which celebrated the victory of Marcus Claudius Marcellus over the Celts (222 BC).

But it was as a writer of comedy that he was most famous, most productive and most original. While he is never ranked as a writer of tragedy with Ennius, Pacuvius, or Accius, he is placed in the canon of the grammarian Volcatius Sedigitus third (immediately after Caecilius and Plautus) in the rank of Roman comic authors. He is there characterized as ardent and impetuous in character and style. He is also appealed to, with Plautus and Ennius, as a master of his art in one of the prologues of Terence. Naevius' comedy, like that of Plautus, seems to have been rather a free adaptation of his originals than a rude copy of them, as those of Livius probably were, or an artistic copy like those of Terence. The titles of most of them, like those of Plautus, and unlike those of Caecilius and Terence, are Latin, not Greek. He drew from the writers of the old political comedy of Athens, as well as from the new comedy of manners, and he attempted to make the stage at Rome, as it had been at Athens, an arena of political and personal warfare. A strong spirit of partisanship is recognized in more than one of the fragments; and this spirit is thoroughly popular and adverse to the senatorial ascendancy which became more and more confirmed with the progress of the second Punic war. Besides his attack on the Metelli and other members of the aristocracy, the great Scipio is the object of a censorious criticism on account of a youthful escapade attributed to him. Among the few lines still remaining from his lost comedies, we seem to recognize the idiomatic force and rapidity of movement characteristic of the style of Plautus. There is also found that love of alliteration which is a marked feature in all the older Latin poets down even to Lucretius.

He was not only the oldest native dramatist, but the first author of an epic poem (Bellum Punicum) which, by combining the representation of actual contemporary history with a mythical background, may be said to have created the Roman type of epic poetry. The poem was one continuous work, but was divided into seven books by a grammarian of a later age. The earlier part of it treated of the mythical adventures of Aeneas in Sicily, Carthage, and Italy, and borrowed from the interview of Zeus and Thetis in the first book of the Iliad the idea of the interview of Jupiter and Venus; which Virgil has made one of the cardinal passages in the Aeneid. The later part treated of the events of the First Punic War in the style of a metrical chronicle. An important influence in Roman literature and belief, which had its origin in Sicily, first appeared in this poem: the recognition of the mythical connection of Aeneas and his Trojans with the foundation of Rome. The few remaining fragments produce the impression of vivid and rapid narrative, to which the flow of the native Saturnian verse, in contradistinction to the weighty and complex structure of the hexameter, was naturally adapted.

The impression we get of the man is that, whether or not he actually enjoyed the full rights of Roman citizenship, he was a vigorous representative of the bold combative spirit of the ancient Roman commons. He was one of those who made the Latin language into a great organ of literature. The phrases still quoted from him have nothing of an antiquated sound, though they have a genuinely idiomatic ring. As a dramatist he worked more in the spirit of Plautus than of Ennius, Pacuvius, Accius, or Terence; but the great Umbrian humorist is separated from his older contemporary, not only by his breadth of comic power, but by his general attitude of moral and political indifference. The power of Naevius was the more genuine Italian gift, the power of satiric criticism which was employed in making men ridiculous; not, like that of Plautus, in extracting amusement from the humours, follies and eccentricities of life. Although our means of forming a fair estimate of Naevius are scanty, all that we do know of him leads to the conclusion that he was far from being the least among the makers of Roman literature, and that with the loss of his writings there was lost a vein of national feeling and genius which rarely reappears.

Surviving titles and fragments

Editions
 M. Barchiesi. Nevio epico; storia, interpretazione, edizione critica dei frammenti del primo epos latino, Padova, 1962
 Fragments (dramas) in Lucian Müller, Livi Andronici et Gn. Naevi Fabularum Reliquiae (1885), and (Bellum Punicum) in his edition of Ennius (1884).
 W. Morel, Fragmenta Poetarum Latinorum Epicorum et Lyricorum praeter Ennium et Lucilium (Leipzig, 1927)
 E. H. Warmington, Remains of Old Latin, vol. II, Livius Andronicus, Naevius, Pacuvius, Accius, 1936.
Naeuius Poeta. Introduzione bibliografica. Testo dei frammenti e commento, éd. E. V. Marmorale, Florence, 2e éd. 1950.
 Alfred Klotz, Scaenicorum Romanorum fragmenta, vol. I, Tragicorum fragmenta, München, 1953.

See also

 Old Latin
 Saturnian (poetry)
 Theatre of ancient Rome

Notes

References

Further reading
 Barchiesi, M. (1978). La Tarentilla revisitata: studi su Nevio comico, Pisa: Giardini.
 Berchem, M. J. (1861). De Gn. Naevii poetae vita et scriptis, Monasterii: Coppenrath.
 Conte, G. B. (1994). Latin Literature: A History. Translated by Joseph B. Solodow. Revised by Don Fowler and Glenn W. Most. Baltimore: Johns Hopkins University Press.
 Crivellari, V. (1889). Quae praecipue hausit Vergilius ex Naevio et Ennio . (On Virgil's indebtedness to Naevius and Ennius.)
 de Melo, W. (2014). Plautus's Dramatic Predecessors and Contemporaries in Rome. The Oxford Handbook of Greek and Roman Comedy. Oxford: Oxford University Press. 
 de Moor, D. (1877). [https://archive.org/details/cnnviusessaisur00moorgoog Cn. Névius, essai sur les commencements de la poésie à Rome], Tournai: Decallonne-Liagre.
 Faber, R. (2012). The Ekphrasis in Naevius' "Bellum Punicum" and Hellenistic Literary Aesthetics. Hermes, 140(4), 417–426.
 Feeney, D. C. (1991). The Gods in Epic: Poets and Critics of the Classical Tradition. New York: Oxford University Press. 
 Flintoff, E. (1988). Naevius and Roman Satire. Latomus, 47(3), 593–603.
 Jocelyn, H. D. (1969). The Poet Cn. Naevius, P. Cornelius Scipio, and Q. Caecilius Metellus. Antichthon 3:32–47.
 
 Krostenko, B. (2013). The Poetics of Naevius' 'Epitaph' and the History of Latin Poetry. The Journal of Roman Studies, 103, 46–64.
 Luck, G. (1983). Naevius and Virgil. Illinois Classical Studies, 8(2), 267–275. 
 Manuwald, Gesine, ed. (2000). Identität und Alterität in der frührömischen Tragödie. Identitäten und Alteritäten, Bd. 3, Altertumswiss. Reihe, Bd. 1. Würzburg, Germany: Universitats Verlag.
  Mommsen, T. History of Rome, bk. iii, ch. 24.
 Rowell, H. (1947). The Original Form of Naevius' Bellum Punicum. The American Journal of Philology'', 68(1), 21–46.

External links

 
 
 
 

Ancient Roman tragic dramatists
Ancient Roman poets
Old Latin-language writers
3rd-century BC Romans
3rd-century BC poets
3rd-century BC Latin writers
Ancient Roman comic dramatists
270s BC births
200s BC deaths
Naevii
Ancient Roman exiles